Karl Chandler is a former professional American football player who played six seasons as an offensive lineman for the New York Giants and Detroit Lions.

References

1952 births
American football offensive linemen
New York Giants players
Detroit Lions players
Princeton Tigers football players
Living people